Markiyeh (also Romanized as Markīyeh) is a village in Markiyeh Rural District, Mirza Kuchek Janghli District, Sowme'eh Sara County, Gilan Province, Iran. At the 2006 census, its population was 1,625, in 416 families.

References 

Populated places in Sowme'eh Sara County